JWH-048 is a selective cannabinoid ligand, with a bindining affinity of Ki = 0.5 ± 0.1 nM for the CB2 subtype, and more than 22 times selectivity over the CB1.

In the United States, all CB1 receptor agonists of the 3-(1-naphthoyl)indole class such as JWH-048 are Schedule I Controlled Substances.

See also
JWH-015
JWH-018
JWH-019
JWH-073

References

Naphthoylindoles
JWH cannabinoids
CB1 receptor agonists